Bolívar Province is a province in the Bolivian department of Cochabamba. Its capital is the city of Bolívar, named after Simón Bolívar, a Venezuelan military and political leader.

Subdivision 
The province is not further subdivided into municipalities. So Bolívar Municipality and Bolívar Province are identical. The province is divided into nine cantons.

The people 
The people are predominantly indigenous citizens of Quechuan descent.

Ref.: obd.descentralizacion.gov.bo

Languages 
The languages spoken in the Bolívar Province are mainly Quechua and Spanish.

See also 
 Machu Tanka Tanka
 Sirk'i
 Wayna Tanka Tanka

References

External links 
 Population data and map of Bolívar Province (Bolívar Municipality)

Provinces of Cochabamba Department